Paul Pollock (born 25 June 1986) is an Irish Marathon runner from Holywood, Northern Ireland. He competed at the Rio 2016 Summer Olympics, finishing the marathon in 32nd position, in a time of 2.16.24. He was the first Irishman home, followed by his teammates Kevin Seaward and Mick Clohisey. His time was the third-fastest by an Irish runner at an Olympic game. He also competed in the men's marathon at the 2020 Summer Olympics held in Tokyo, Japan.

He first competed in a major championship in 2004 when representing Northern Ireland at the Commonwealth Youth Games in Bendigo, Australia. He finished 4th in the 1500 m. By 2017, he had 15 Irish caps, as well as having represented Northern Ireland on numerous occasions. He has competed on the world stage at each of the major global championships – Commonwealth Games, World Championships, European Championships, and Olympic Games.

In 2018, Pollock qualified to run in the Commonwealth Games marathon, but was forced to withdraw due to injury during training in Australia.

Following his participation in the 2013 World Athletics Championships, he continues to write a monthly blog detailing his races and training. Having originally been a member of Abbey AC (Newtonabbey, Northern Ireland), he now represents both Annadale Striders (Belfast) and Kent AC (England). He continues to train, coach, and compete, alongside working part-time as an Emergency Medicine doctor.

Championships Record

References

External links
 Paul Pollock's Marathon blog
 
 
 
 

1986 births
Living people
Sportspeople from Belfast
Irish male marathon runners
Male long-distance runners from Northern Ireland
Male marathon runners from Northern Ireland
Athletes (track and field) at the 2014 Commonwealth Games
Athletes (track and field) at the 2018 Commonwealth Games
Commonwealth Games competitors for Northern Ireland
Athletes (track and field) at the 2016 Summer Olympics
Athletes (track and field) at the 2020 Summer Olympics
Olympic athletes of Ireland